Enrico Manca (27 November 1931 – 5 July 2011) was an Italian politician.

Biography
Having graduated with a degree in law from the University of Rome "La Sapienza", in 1959 Manca joined the Italian state broadcaster RAI and from 1961 to 1972 was editor of Giornale Radio Rai, central editor of the TV news, and director of cultural television services.

A member of the Italian Socialist Party (PSI), he was elected a Deputy for the first time in 1972 and served as Minister of Foreign Trade in the Cossiga II Cabinet and in the Forlani Cabinet. His name was found on the lists of members of the P2 Masonic lodge (card no. 864) in 1981, although Manca himself repeatedly denied any adherence to the lodge.

On 4 December 1986 he resigned as a Deputy due to a conflict of interests, having agreed that year to serve as the next President of RAI. He was re-elected in 1987, but again had to resign due to the incompatibility that arose from his new position. He was the head of RAI until 1992, when he returned to parliament having been once again re-elected as a Deputy.

In 1994 he founded the Reformist Socialist Party with his PSI colleague (and erstwhile P2 member) Fabrizio Cicchitto, where he remained until 1996, when he joined the Socialist Party. Later, he became a member of the Italian Democratic Socialists and, in 2002, The Daisy. In 2007 he finally joined the Democratic Party, in which he remained a member until his death in 2011.

References

External links

1931 births
2011 deaths
Politicians from Rome
Italian Socialist Party politicians
Reformist Socialist Party politicians
Socialist Party (Italy, 1996) politicians
Democracy is Freedom – The Daisy politicians
Democratic Party (Italy) politicians
Deputies of Legislature VI of Italy
Deputies of Legislature VII of Italy
Deputies of Legislature VIII of Italy
Deputies of Legislature IX of Italy
Deputies of Legislature X of Italy
Deputies of Legislature XI of Italy